Samuel Woolf Magnus (30 September 1910 – 28 February 1992), was a judge and politician in both Britain and Zambia.

Background
He was the son of Samuel Woolf Magnus. He was educated at University College, London where he received a BA Honors in 1931. He married, in 1938, Anna Gertrude Shane. They had one daughter.

Professional career
Called to Bar, Gray’s Inn, 1937. Served War of 1939–45, Army. Practised in London, 1937–59; partner in legal firm, Northern Rhodesia, 1959–63; subseq. legal consultant. QC 1964, MLC 1962, Puisne Judge, High Court for Zambia, 1968. FCIArb 1987. He was Justice of Appeal, at the Court of Appeal for Zambia in 1971. He was Commissioner, of the Foreign Compensation Commission from 1977–83.

Political career
He was Liberal Party candidate for the Central Hackney Division of London at the 1945 General Election. 

He was Treasurer of the Association of Liberal Lawyers. He was a Member of the Council of the London Liberal Party and President of North Hendon Liberal Association until 1959. He served as an MP January–October 1964 in Northern Rhodesia and an MP in Zambia from 1964–68. He was Chairman of the Law, Parliamentary and General Purposes Cttee of the Board of Deputies of British Jews from 1979–83.

Publications
(with M. Estrin) Companies Act 1947, 1947 
(with M. Estrin) Companies: Law and Practice, 1948, 5th edn 1978, and Supplement, 1981
(with A. M. Lyons) Advertisement Control, 1949 
Magnus on Leasehold Property (Temporary Provisions) Act 1951, 1951
Magnus on Landlord and Tenant Act 1954, 1954
Magnus on Housing Repairs and Rents Act 1954, 1954 
Magnus on the Rent Act 1957, 1957
(with F. E. Price) Knight’s Annotated Housing Acts, 1958
(with Tovell) Magnus on Housing Finance, 1960
(with M. Estrin) Companies Act 1967, 1967 
Magnus on the Rent Act 1968, 1969
Magnus on Business Tenancies, 1970
Magnus on the Rent Act 1977, 1978 
Butterworth’s Company Forms Manual, 1987 
contributor: Law Jl; Halsbury’s Laws of England; Encycl. of Forms and Precedents; Atkin’s Court Forms and Precedents

References

1910 births
1992 deaths
Liberal Party (UK) parliamentary candidates
Alumni of University College London
Members of the Board of Deputies of British Jews